Iván Alejandro Furios (born 20 May 1979) is an Argentine football defender who plays for Olimpo in the Argentine Torneo Federal A.

External links

 Argentine Primera statistics

1979 births
Living people
Sportspeople from Entre Ríos Province
Association football defenders
Argentine footballers
Argentine expatriate footballers
Boca Juniors footballers
Chacarita Juniors footballers
Club Alianza Lima footballers
José Gálvez FBC footballers
Instituto footballers
Aldosivi footballers
Neuchâtel Xamax FCS players
Olimpo footballers
Club Atlético Patronato footballers
Peruvian Primera División players
Swiss Super League players
Expatriate footballers in Peru
Expatriate footballers in Switzerland